Mark Berghofer (born 21 January 1985) is an Australian international lawn bowler.

Bows career
Berghofer won the gold medal in the triples with Wayne Turley and Leif Selby and the bronze medal in the fours at the 2009 Asia Pacific Bowls Championships in Kuala Lumpur. Two years later he won another gold at the 2011 Championships in Adelaide, when winning the fours with Mark Casey, Aron Sherriff and Nathan Rice. he laso picked up a silver in the triples (his fourth medal in total).

He was selected to represent Australia at the 2010 Commonwealth Games in Delhi, where he competed in the pairs event.

References

External links
 
 

1985 births
Australian male bowls players
Living people
Bowls players at the 2010 Commonwealth Games
Commonwealth Games competitors for Australia
21st-century Australian people